The Mt. Rainier Railroad and Logging Museum or MRRR, formerly the Mt. Rainier Scenic Railroad (MRSR), is a steam-powered heritage railroad operating in the U.S. state of Washington between Elbe and Mineral. The railroad travels on trackage that passes through thick forest just south of Mount Rainier. The depot, gift shop and ticket office are located in Elbe. The train travels to the Logging Museum exhibits located in Mineral. The MRRR ran its collection of vintage rail equipment over seven miles of track, part of Tacoma Rail's Mountain Division.

The railroad has three steam engines, as well as a diesel locomotive in regular service, along with several other locomotives of both types of engines. Most of the railroad's engines are geared steam engines. These specialized types of steam engines — Shay engines, Heisler engines, Climax engines and a Willamette engine were used in the early 20th century for logging. Compared to conventional steam locomotives, geared locomotives were better-suited for the steep grades, sharp curves and uneven profiles of hastily laid track typical of logging operations. Thus, the MRRR sought to preserve and operate historic geared locomotives and related logging technology in order to present visitors with a sense of a bygone logging era critical to the development of the Pacific Northwest.

Prior to 2016, steam operations were run based on availability of volunteer operators, who comprised the great majority of railroad personnel. However after being purchased by American Heritage Railways in 2016, the railroad's operations were run by professional staff. The MRRR's regular schedule ran weekends from Memorial Day to late October, with special event Polar Express trains November through December. In May 2020, American Heritage Railways announced that the railroad would cease operations "for the foreseeable future" due to financial losses caused by the Coronavirus (COVID-19) pandemic. The last Polar Express train ran from November to December of 2019.  On September 15, 2022, it was announced that the railroad would resume operations by 2025, including the restoration of track to Eatonville that will add 9 miles to the railroad.

History

The MRRR operated over track originating in Tacoma, on a route founded there over a century ago. In 1887, the Hart brothers constructed a short,  narrow gauge railroad originating at 46th Street in Tacoma, Washington. In 1890, the railroad was reorganized by another interest as the Tacoma Eastern Railroad, at which time the tracks were converted to standard gauge and extended a distance of six miles. The railroad was acquired in 1900 by yet another group of investors who had financial interests east of Elbe, the Nisqually Coal Fields, thus providing the impetus to extend the Tacoma Eastern from Tacoma to the area where the MRRR runs today. The route was also extended to access stands of virgin timber south of Mount Rainier, eventually reaching Morton.

Despite formal organization under the name Tacoma Eastern, the railroad was controlled by investors far from the Pacific Northwest. The Chicago, Milwaukee, St. Paul and Pacific Railroad, also known as the "Milwaukee Road", reputedly had control of the Tacoma Eastern as early as 1901. In the 1890s, the Milwaukee Road's directors desired a connection from the Midwest to the Pacific coast. The Tacoma Eastern was an appealing investment for the Milwaukee Road. The Tacoma Eastern remained a subsidiary of the Milwaukee Road, owned through stock interest only, until 1918 when the United States Railroad Administration coordinated the Milwaukee Road's absorption of all its subsidiaries into one unified system.

The Tacoma Eastern, though, continued to exist as an independent entity within the Chicago, Milwaukee, St. Paul and Pacific Railroad system, where it was known as the National Park branch. This segment of the system was one of the Milwaukee Road's most profitable lines. As such, it was preserved amidst the Milwaukee Road's bankruptcy in 1980. The Tacoma Eastern was a viable carrier of lumber from stands of timber owned by the Weyerhaeuser Corporation, whose tracts of land still surround the MRSR today and provide commercial traffic on the line.

In the wake of the Milwaukee Road's 1980 bankruptcy, Tacoma lumberman Tom Murray, Jr., sought to open a portion of the line to tourists. MRSR was then created by Tom Murray to operate historic equipment stored in Tacoma. The Weyerhaeuser Corporation allowed the MRSR to operate its equipment on a seven-mile segment of the line from Elbe to Mineral. Weyerhaeuser maintained control of the track until 1998 when the corporation transferred control of all of its rail interests to the City of Tacoma, into what is now known as Tacoma Rail. This transfer of ownership did not affect the MRSR and its tourist operations, nor the availability of the route to commercial shipment. In mid 2016, due to decline and poor management, MRSR was sold to American Heritage Railways, which also owns the world renowned Durango & Silverton Narrow Gauge Railroad, rebranding the MRSR as the Mount Rainier Railroad and Logging Museum.

Locomotives

All of the railroad's locomotives are serviced at the maintenance shops in Mineral, WA.

See also

 Oregon Coast Scenic Railroad
 Northwest Railway Museum
 Chelatchie Prairie Railroad
 Chehalis–Centralia Railroad
 List of heritage railroads in the United States

References

External links
 Mount Rainier Scenic Railroad
 Map of the Tacoma Eastern Railroad

Heritage railroads in Washington (state)
Transportation in Lewis County, Washington
Transportation in Pierce County, Washington
Tourist attractions in Lewis County, Washington
Tourist attractions in Pierce County, Washington
Mount Rainier